West Ferris Secondary School (WFSS) is located on Marshall Park Drive in the West Ferris area of North Bay, Ontario. It is a member of the Near North District School Board.

Overview 
West Ferris Secondary School's motto is "Commit to Excellence".  Athletes and students at West Ferris are known as the West Ferris Trojans and the school colours are forest green and white.

Although West Ferris Secondary is widely known for its athletics and trades courses, the school offers three different Specialist High Skills Major (SHSM) courses.  These SHSM courses are offered in the Arts and Culture, Business, and Construction domains, and students who complete a sufficient number of courses in one of these areas are awarded a special certificate indicating a competency in said field.  Completion of a SHSM program allows students to focus on a career path that matches their skills and interests. West Ferris also has a ST-Wireless course in which each student is provided with a Macbook Pro and go through a higher standard technology focused course.

See also
List of high schools in Ontario

External links 
 West Ferris Secondary School

High schools in North Bay, Ontario
Educational institutions in Canada with year of establishment missing